The following is a list of Registered Historic Places in Eaton County, Michigan.



|}

See also

 List of Michigan State Historic Sites in Eaton County, Michigan
 List of National Historic Landmarks in Michigan
 National Register of Historic Places listings in Michigan
 Listings in neighboring counties: Barry, Calhoun, Clinton, Ingham, Ionia, Jackson

References

Eaton County
Eaton County, Michigan
Buildings and structures in Eaton County, Michigan